Tony Adams (born 1966) is an English football player and manager.

Tony or Toni Adams may also refer to:
"Tony Adams", song by Joe Strummer tribute to the footballer, from Rock Art and the X-Ray Style
Tony Adams (actor) (born 1940), Welsh actor
Tony Adams (quarterback) (born 1950), American and Canadian football quarterback
Tony Adams (safety) (born 1999), American football safety
Tony Adams (producer) (1953–2005), Irish-born film and stage producer
Toni Adams (1964–2010), American female professional wrestler

See also
Anthony Adams (disambiguation)
Adams (surname)